Moonstone (formerly Little River) is an unincorporated community in Humboldt County, California. For census purposes, it is aggregated in Westhaven-Moonstone, California. The area is sited adjacent to Pacific Ocean beach and the mouth of the Little River with views of the rugged coastline.

References

Unincorporated communities in Humboldt County, California
Unincorporated communities in California